Michel Hessmann (born 6 April 2001) is a German professional racing cyclist, who currently rides for UCI WorldTeam .

Major results

2018
 1st  Time trial, National Junior Road Championships
 4th Time trial, UCI Junior Road World Championships
 4th Time trial, UEC European Junior Road Championships
 4th Johan Museeuw Classic
 6th Overall Trophée Centre Morbihan
 7th Overall Saarland Trofeo
 9th Overall Giro della Lunigiana
1st  Young rider classification
2019
 1st  Overall Trophée Centre Morbihan
1st Stage 2 (ITT)
 National Junior Road Championships
2nd Time trial
2nd Road race
 4th Overall Course de la Paix Juniors
 5th Time trial, UCI Junior Road World Championships
 5th Overall Giro della Lunigiana
 5th GP Luxembourg
 7th Trofeo Emilio Paganessi
2020
 1st  National Under-23 XC MTB Championships
 UEC European Road Championships
1st  Team relay
6th Under-23 time trial
 10th Overall Müller - Die lila Logistik Rad-Bundesliga
1st Ilsfeld-Auenstein
2021
 National Under-23 Road Championships
1st  Time trial
2nd Road race
 1st  Mountains classification, Grand Prix Priessnitz spa
 3rd Overall Kreiz Breizh Elites
1st Stage 1 (TTT)
 4th Time trial, UEC European Under-23 Road Championships
 7th Giro del Belvedere
 8th Overall Orlen Nations Grand Prix
 8th Time trial, UCI Road World Under-23 Championships
 10th Ster van Zwolle
2022
 3rd Overall Tour de l'Avenir
1st Stage 5 (TTT)
 5th Time trial, UCI Road World Under-23 Championships

Notes

References

External links

2001 births
Living people
German male cyclists
Sportspeople from Münster
Cyclists from North Rhine-Westphalia
21st-century German people